Michael Butler is an American politician who currently serves the St. Louis Recorder of Deeds. He previously served in the Missouri House of Representatives.

Early life and career
Michael Butler was raised in the Shaw neighborhood in St. Louis. He holds a bachelor's degree in business from Alabama A&M University, where he was the study body president, and a master's degree in public affairs from the University of Missouri. He worked as a legislative aide to Representative Mary Still and to Senator Robin Wright-Jones.

Legislature
In the 2012 general election, Butler was elected to the Missouri House of Representatives from the 79th district. He was subsequently reelected in 2014 and 2016. In his final term, he served as the Minority Caucus Chair.

Recorder of Deeds
Butler was elected St. Louis Recorder of Deeds in 2018 and reelected in 2022. While recorder he served as the chairman of the Missouri Democratic Party from 2020 until 2023.

References

21st-century American politicians
Living people
Missouri Democrats
Politicians from St. Louis
University of Missouri alumni